Julian Knowle and Igor Zelenay were the defending champions but decided not to participate.
Stefano Ianni and Dane Propoggia won the title, defeating Alessio di Mauro and Simone Vagnozzi 6–3, 6–2 in the final.

Seeds

Draw

Draw

References
 Main Draw

Orbetello Challenger - Doubles
2012 Doubles